Sara Errani and Roberta Vinci were the defending champions, but Roberta Vinci chose not to continue her performance before the quarterfinals.
Czech pair Iveta Benešová and Barbora Záhlavová-Strýcová defeated Natalie Grandin and Vladimíra Uhlířová in the final 5–7, 6–4, [11–9] to claim the title.

Seeds
The first seeds received a bye into the quarterfinals.

Draw

Draw

References
 Main Draw

Doubles 2011